Perry River Dam is a dam in Queensland, Australia, located  south west of Bundaberg. The dam is a roller compacted concrete embankment 12m high and 104m long. From a catchment area of 98 km2 it impounds a maximum of 1,050 megalitres.

The dam was constructed in 1996 to provide a water supply to Mt Rawdon Gold Mine, located 5km south-west of the dam. The Mt Rawdon project was acquired from Resolute and Samson Exploration by Equigold NL in 1998 and commenced production in February 2001. Since November 2011 the mine has been owned and operated by Evolution Mining. The 2018 Melbourne Cup trophy was made with gold from the Mt Rawdon mine.

The Mt Rawdon mine is expected to complete operations in 2027, investigations are underway to use the mine pit as part of a pumped hydroelectric development, likely involving water diverted from the Perry River Dam.

See also

List of dams and reservoirs in Australia

Reservoirs in Queensland
Wide Bay–Burnett
Dams in Queensland